The 2010 Esso Cup was Canada's second annual national women's midget hockey championship, played April 18–24, 2010 at the Co-operators Centre at Evraz Place in Regina, Saskatchewan. The Thunder Bay Queens defeated the Notre Dame Hounds 4–3 in the gold medal game to win their first Esso Cup title. Thunder Bay's Kaitlyn Tougas was named the tournament's most valuable player.

Teams

Round robin

Standings

Scores

 Moncton 4 - Richelieu 1
 Notre Dame 5 - Edmonton 2
 Thunder Bay 2 - Regina 1
 Notre Dame 5 - Richelieu 3
 Edmonton 3 - Thunder Bay 2
 Regina 4 - Moncton 2
 Thunder Bay 5 - Richelieu 1
 Notre Dame 4 - Moncton 3 (OT)
 Regina 2 - Edmonton 1 (OT)
 Thunder Bay 5 - Moncton 2
 Richelieu 4 - Edmonton 3
 Notre Dame 4 - Regina 2
 Edmonton 3 - Moncton 2 (SO)
 Thunder Bay 5 - Notre Dame 1
 Regina 3 - Richelieu 1

Playoffs

Semi-finals
 Thunder Bay 2 - Edmonton 1
 Notre Dame 5 - Regina 0

Bronze-medal game
 Edmonton 5 - Regina 1

Gold-medal game
 Thunder Bay 4 - Notre Dame 3

Individual awards
 Most Valuable Player: Kaitlyn Tougas (Thunder Bay)
 Top Scorer: Brienna Gillanders (Notre Dame)
 Top Forward: Janik Robichaud (Moncton)
 Top Defenceman: Riana Magee (Edmonton)
 Top Goaltender: Samantha Langford (Regina)
 Most Sportsmanlike Player: Kaitlyn Quarrell (Thunder Bay)

Road to the Esso Cup

Atlantic Region
Regional Tournament held March 18–20, 2010

Round robin

Championship Game 
 Moncton 4 - Metro 1
Moncton advances to Esso Cup

Quebec
Dodge Cup Midget Championship held March 31-April 4, 2010

Semi-finals 
 Bas St-Laurent 1 – Québec 0
 Richelieu 3 - Lac St-Louis 1

Championship Game 
 Richelieu 4 – Bas St-Laurent 1
Richelieu wins Dodge Cup and advances to Esso Cup

Ontario
Ontario Women's Hockey Association Championship held April 9–11, 2010

Semi-finals 
 Stoney Creek 2 – Brampton 0
 Thunder Bay 3 - Willowdale 0

Championship Game 
 Thunder Bay 1 – Stoney Creek 0
Thunder Bay wins championship and advances to Esso Cup

Western Region
Best-of-3 series played April 2–4, 2010
Notre Dame Hounds vs Pembina Valley Hawks
 Game 1: Notre Dame 4 - Pembina Valley 3
 Game 2: Notre Dame 3 - Pembina Valley 2
Notre Dame wins series and advances to Esso Cup

Pacific Region
Best-of-3 series played April 2–4, 2010
Thompson-Okanagan Rockets vs Edmonton Thunder
 Game 1: Edmonton 5 - Thompson-Okanagan 0
 Game 2: Edmonton 3 - Thompson-Okanagan 0
Edmonton wins series and advances to Esso Cup

See also
 Esso Cup

References

External links
 2010 Esso Cup Home Page at HockeyCanada.com
 Hockey Canada-Esso Cup Guide and Record Book
 Road to the 2010 Esso Cup

Esso Cup
Ice hockey competitions in Saskatchewan
Esso Cup
Sports competitions in Regina, Saskatchewan